Idara-e-Shariah,, is a socio-religious organization of Indian Muslims associated with the Ahle Sunnat wal Jamaat (Barelvi) movement. Its headquarter is situated in Sultanganj, Patna, Bihar. It was established in 1968 to deal with problems of personal matters of the Indian Muslims. It has branches in Uttar Pradesh, Jharkhand, Chhattisgarh, Orissa and West Bengal.
 
Idara has a great influence over the lacs of masses. It is responsible for moon sighting and declaration of Islamic festivals in these states. It is considered as the highest socio-religious body of Muslims in Jharkhand, Ranchi.

Functions
The other important activity of Idara-e-Shariah is Darul Qaza, or informal Islamic courts, where the cases are heard and out of court settlement is being given in cases related to Personal Law. Idara-e-Shariah. Darul Ifta is also an important part of Idara-e-Shariah where legal opinions are given according to Quran and Hadees in various matters related to Muslims. Idara-e-Shariah has a Department of Education which is an umbrella body of thousands of Primary religious schools.
The chief general secretary of Idara-E-Sharia, Maulana Qutubuddin Razwi in Jharkhand.
 
Sanaullah Rizvi is chief administrator of Idara-e-Sharia, Bihar
Idara-e Shariah also guides the Muslim community during elections. It normally issues appeals and statements indicating their voting preferences to their followers at election time.
Idara-e-Sharia at Firangi Mahali, Lucknow proposed to inform Muslims in Uttar Pradesh to keep preparations for the documents required for the National Register of Citizens (NRC).

Skill Development training
Idara-e-Sharia Khajur Banna in Patna was selected by the Ministry of Minority Affairs, Govt. of India to provide skill development training center.

References 

Sunni organizations
Barelvi organizations
Islamic organisations based in India
Barelvi